The 2019 Montreux Ladies Open was a professional tennis tournament played on outdoor clay courts. It was the third edition of the tournament which was part of the 2019 ITF Women's World Tennis Tour. It took place in Montreux, Switzerland between 2 and 8 September 2019.

Singles main-draw entrants

Seeds

 1 Rankings are as of 26 August 2019.

Other entrants
The following players received wildcards into the singles main draw:
  Valentina Ryser
  Nina Stadler
  Tess Sugnaux
  Joanne Züger

The following players received entry from the qualifying draw:
  Sara Cakarevic
  Xenia Knoll
  Verena Meliss
  Svenja Ochsner
  Ksenia Palkina
  Marine Partaud

The following player received entry as a lucky loser:
  Fiona Ganz

Champions

Singles

 Olga Danilović def.  Julia Grabher, 6–2, 6–3

Doubles

 Xenia Knoll /  Mandy Minella def.  Ylena In-Albon /  Conny Perrin, 6–3, 6–4

References

External links
 2019 Montreux Ladies Open at ITFtennis.com
 Official website

2019 ITF Women's World Tennis Tour
2019 in Swiss tennis
September 2019 sports events in Switzerland
Montreux Ladies Open